Bửu Hòa is a ward located in Biên Hòa city of Đồng Nai province, Vietnam. It has an area of about 4.1km2 and the population in 2017 was 23,238.

References

Bien Hoa